The Donner und Blitzen River is a river on the eastern Oregon high desert that drains a relatively arid basin, the southern portion of Harney Basin, from roughly 20 to 80 miles (30 to 130 km) south-southeast of Burns including Malheur National Wildlife Refuge.  Though much of its course is marsh, it offers scenic glaciated canyons, unique ecosystems, and exceptional wild trout fisheries. Named by soldiers of German origin, the Donner und Blitzen River translates as "thunder and lightning".  The name usually brings to mind two of Santa Claus's reindeer, but the river is named for a thunderstorm the soldiers experienced as they crossed the river; dry lightning is an almost daily occurrence in the region during certain times of the year.

Numerous nearby springs create its tributaries including South Fork Blitzen River, Little Blitzen River, Big Indian Creek, Little Indian Creek, Fish Creek, Mud Creek, and Ankle Creek. It collects these and runs north or northwest, descending rapidly to the plateau floor, then turns northward to Malheur Lake, which has no outlet. It does not pass through any cities, though it comes within  of Frenchglen. Much of the river runs through what was once the P Ranch, one of the largest ranches in the west until the ranch was purchased by the United States Government in 1935. 

The Blitzen is home to a native species of Great Basin Redband Trout amongst many other unique forms of flora and fauna. Over the last century, the fish population has decreased due to increased human activity in the surrounding areas. As part of the 2000 Steens Mountain Protection Act, congress and President Clinton signed off on the creation of the Donner und Blitzen Red Band Trout Reserve. The Reserve was designated “to conserve, protect, and enhance the Donner und Blitzen population of redband trout and the unique ecosystem of plants, fish, and wildlife of a river system.” 

In 1988,  of rivers in its basin were designated Wild and Scenic, and another  were added in 2000. The Oregon Department of Environmental Quality (DEQ) lists seven temperature impairments on the river system. The minimum recorded flow  occurred December 9, 1972, caused by widespread freezing.

See also
 Blitzen, Oregon
 List of rivers of Oregon
 List of longest streams of Oregon
 List of National Wild and Scenic Rivers
 Harney Basin

References

External links

 Donner ünd Blitzen Wild and Scenic River - Bureau of Land Management
 Donner und Blitzen River - Oregon Natural Desert Association
 Little Blitzen River and Bridge Creek Remote Sensing Survey

Rivers of Oregon
Wild and Scenic Rivers of the United States
Rivers of Harney County, Oregon
Rivers of the Great Basin